Plectranthus is a genus of about 85 species of flowering plants from the sage family, Lamiaceae, found mostly in southern and tropical Africa and Madagascar. Common names include spur-flower. Plectranthus species are herbaceous perennial plants, rarely annuals or soft-wooded shrubs, sometimes succulent; sometimes with a tuberous base.  

Several species are grown as ornamental plants. The cultivar  = 'Plepalila'  has received the Royal Horticultural Society's Award of Garden Merit. 

Recent phylogenetic analysis found Plectranthus to be paraphyletic with respect to Coleus, Solenostemon, Pycnostachys and Anisochilus. The most recent treatment of the genus resurrected the genus Coleus, and 212 names were changed from combinations in Plectranthus, Pycnostachys and Anisochilus. Equilabium was segregated from Plectranthus, after phylogenetic studies supported its recognition as a phylogenetically distinct genus.

Etymology
The word plectranthus derives from the Greek πλῆκτρον (plēktron), "anything to strike with, an instrument for striking the lyre, a spear point" + ἄνθος (anthos), "blossom, flower".

Species

Paton et al. (2019) listed 72 species. , Plants of the World Online accepted 84:

Plectranthus alboviolaceus Gürke – South Africa: E. Cape Prov. to N. KwaZulu-Natal
Plectranthus ambiguus (Bolus) Codd – South Africa: E. Cape Prov. to N. KwaZulu-Natal
Plectranthus amplexicaulis Hedge – Madagascar
Plectranthus antongilicus Hedge – Madagascar
Plectranthus asymmetricus A.J.Paton – Zambia
Plectranthus atroviolaceus Hedge – Madagascar
Plectranthus aulihanensis (Schweinf. & Volkens) ined.
Plectranthus betamponus Hedge – Madagascar
Plectranthus bracteolatus A.J.Paton – Tanzania
Plectranthus brevicaulis (Baker) Hedge – Madagascar
Plectranthus brevimentus T.J.Edwards (also as P. brevimentum) – South Africa: Eastern Cape Prov
Plectranthus canescens Benth. – Madagascar
Plectranthus capuronii Hedge – Madagascar
Plectranthus chimanimanensis S.Moore – E. Zimbabwe to W. Mozambique
Plectranthus ciliatus E.Mey. – South Africa and Eswatini
Plectranthus clementiae Hedge – Madagascar
Plectranthus cordatus A.J.Paton & Phillipson – Madagascar
Plectranthus decaryi Hedge – Madagascar
Plectranthus delicatissimus Hedge – Madagascar
Plectranthus ecklonii Benth. – South Africa
Plectranthus elegans Britten – S. Malawi
Plectranthus elegantulus Briq. – South Africa: KwaZulu-Natal
Plectranthus ellipticus Hedge – Madagascar
Plectranthus emirnensis (Baker) Hedge – Madagascar
Plectranthus ernstii Codd – South Africa: E. Cape Prov. to S. KwaZulu-Natal
Plectranthus forsythii Hedge – Madagascar
Plectranthus fruticosus L’Hér. – S. Mozambique to South Africa
Plectranthus gardneri Thwaites – Sri Lanka
Plectranthus gibbosus Hedge – Madagascar
Plectranthus godefroyae (N.E.Br.) ined.
Plectranthus grallatus Briq. – South Africa, Lesotho
Plectranthus grandibracteatus Hedge – Madagascar
Plectranthus guruensis A.J.Paton – Mozambique
Plectranthus hexaphyllus Baker – Madagascar
Plectranthus hilliardiae Codd – South Africa: Transkei to KwaZulu-Natal
Plectranthus hirsutus Hedge – Madagascar
Plectranthus hoslundioides Scott-Elliot – Madagascar
Plectranthus humbertii Hedge – Madagascar
Plectranthus incrassatus Hedge – Madagascar
Plectranthus laurifolius Hedge – Madagascar
Plectranthus linearis Hedge – Madagascar
Plectranthus longiflorus Benth. – Madagascar
Plectranthus longipetiolatus Hedge – Madagascar
Plectranthus lucidus (Benth.) van Jaarsv. & T.J.Edwards – South Africa: S. Cape Prov
Plectranthus macilentus Hedge – Madagascar
Plectranthus malvinus van Jaarsv. & T.J.Edwards – South Africa: E. Cape Prov
Plectranthus mandalensis Baker – Malawi (Mt. Mulanje), Mozambique (Mt. Namuli)
Plectranthus marquesii Gürke
Plectranthus mechowianus (Briq.) ined.
Plectranthus membranaceus (Scott-Elliot) Hedge – Madagascar
Plectranthus miserabilis Briq.
Plectranthus mocquerysii Briq. – Madagascar
Plectranthus mzimvubuensis van Jaarsv. – South Africa: SE. Cape Prov
Plectranthus oblanceolatus Hedge – Madagascar
Plectranthus oertendahlii T.C.E.Fr. – South Africa: S. KwaZulu-Natal
Plectranthus ombrophilus Hedge – Madagascar
Plectranthus oribiensis Codd – South Africa: KwaZulu-Natal
Plectranthus papilionaceus Ranir. & Phillipson – Madagascar
Plectranthus parvifolius Talbot
Plectranthus pichompae Hedge – Madagascar
Plectranthus poggeanus (Briq.) ined.
Plectranthus praetermissus Codd – South Africa: SE. Cape Prov
Plectranthus preussii (Gürke) ined.
Plectranthus purpuratus Harv. – South Africa
Plectranthus reflexus van Jaarsv. & T.J.Edwards – South Africa: SE. Cape Prov
Plectranthus rosulatus Hedge – NW. Madagascar
Plectranthus rubropunctatus Codd – South Africa: Limpopo to Eswatini
Plectranthus rubroviolaceus Hedge – Madagascar
Plectranthus saccatus Benth. – South Africa: SE. Cape Prov. to KwaZulu-Natal
Plectranthus scaposus Hedge – Madagascar
Plectranthus schweinfurthii Sprenger
Plectranthus secundiflorus (Baker) Hedge – Tanzania (Uluguru Mts.)
Plectranthus strangulatus A.J.Paton – Tanzania (Uluguru Mts.)
Plectranthus strigosus Benth. ex E.Mey. – South Africa: S. Cape Prov
Plectranthus stylesii T.J.Edwards – South Africa: Eastern Cape Prov
Plectranthus swynnertonii S.Moore – S. Trop. Africa to South Africa, Mpumalanga
Plectranthus termiticola A.J.Paton
Plectranthus trilobus Hedge – Madagascar
Plectranthus verticillatus (L.f.) Druce – S. Mozambique to South Africa
Plectranthus vestitus Benth. – Madagascar
Plectranthus vinaceus Hedge – Madagascar
Plectranthus viridis (Briq.) ined.
Plectranthus zenkeri Gürke
Plectranthus zuluensis T.Cooke – South Africa: SE. Cape Prov. to Eswatini

Transferred to Coleus
Species transferred to Coleus in 2019 include:
Plectranthus amboinicus (Lour.) Spreng. → Coleus amboinicus
Plectranthus argentatus S.T.Blake → Coleus argentatus
Plectranthus barbatus Andrews → Coleus barbatus
Plectranthus caninus Roth → Coleus caninus
Plectranthus cataractarum B.J.Pollard → Coleus cataractarum
Plectranthus cremnus B.J.Conn → Coleus cremnus
Plectranthus dissitiflorus (Guerke) J.K.Morton → Coleus dissitiflorus
Plectranthus edulis (Vatke) Agnew → Coleus maculosus subsp. edulis
Plectranthus esculentus N.E.Br. → Coleus esculentus
Plectranthus graveolens R.Br. → Coleus graveolens
Plectranthus hadiensis (Forssk.) Schweinf. ex Sprenger → Coleus hadiensis
Plectranthus neochilus Schltr. → Coleus neochilus
Plectranthus ornatus Codd → Coleus comosus
Plectranthus parviflorus Willd. → Coleus australis
Plectranthus rotundifolius (Poir.) Spreng. → Coleus rotundifolius
Plectranthus scutellarioides (L.) R.Br. → Coleus scutellarioides
Plectranthus socotranus Radcl.-Sm. → Coleus socotranus
Plectranthus unguentarius Codd → Coleus unguentarius
Plectranthus welwitschii (Briq.) Codd → Coleus fredericii

Other species formerly placed in Plectranthus
Anisochilus carnosus (L. f.) Wall. ex Benth. (as P. strobilifer Roxb.)
Capitanopsis oreophila (Hedge) Mwany., A.J.Paton & Culham (as P. bipinnatus A.J.Paton)
Isodon coetsa (Buch.-Ham. ex D.Don) Kudô (as P. coetsa Buch.-Ham. ex D.Don)
Isodon inflexus (Thunb.) Kudô (as P. inflexus (Thunb.) Vahl ex Benth.)
Isodon lophanthoides (Buch.-Ham. ex D.Don) H.Hara (as P. striatus Benth.)
Isodon rugosus (Wall. ex Benth.) Codd (as P. rugosus Wall. ex Benth.)
Isodon sculponeatus (Vaniot) Kudô (as P. sculponeatus Vaniot)

References

External links

 
Lamiaceae genera
Root vegetables
Leaf vegetables